Oxana Vladimirovna Slesarenko (born April 27, 1970, in Sverdlovsk, USSR) is a Russian wheelchair curler.

Career
She is a member of the local sports club "Rodnik" (Yekaterinburg), where she started wheelchair curling in 2003. It was the first wheelchair curling team in Russia.

She was a participant of the 2014 Winter Paralympic games and eight World Wheelchair Curling Championships.

She injured her spinal cord in a car accident in 1986 when she was at the age of 16.

Awards 
 Medal of the Order "For Merit to the Fatherland" I class (17 March 2014) – for the huge contribution to the development of physical culture and sports, and for the high athletic performances at the 2014 Paralympic Winter Games in Sochi
 Merited Master of Sports of Russia (2013)
 International Paralympic Committee Athlete of the Month: February 2012.

Teams

References

External links 

Profile at International Paralympic Committee site (old version)
Profile at Russian National Paralympic Committee site
Video: 

Living people
1970 births
Sportspeople from Yekaterinburg
Russian female curlers
Russian wheelchair curlers
Paralympic medalists in wheelchair curling
Paralympic silver medalists for Russia
Wheelchair curlers at the 2014 Winter Paralympics
Medalists at the 2014 Winter Paralympics
Paralympic wheelchair curlers of Russia
World wheelchair curling champions
Recipients of the Medal of the Order "For Merit to the Fatherland" I class
21st-century Russian women